Rolf Schimpf (born 14 November 1924) is a German television actor.

Filmography
Mensch Bachmann (1984, TV series)
The Old Fox (1986–2007, TV series)

External links

Agency Palz Munich 

1924 births
Living people
German male television actors
German male film actors
20th-century German male actors
21st-century German male actors
Male actors from Berlin